Colegio Santa Inés is a Chilean high school located in San Vicente de Tagua Tagua, Cachapoal Province, Chile. It was established in March 16, 1965.

References 

Educational institutions established in 1965
Secondary schools in Chile
Schools in Cachapoal Province
1965 establishments in Chile